Éric Teurnier is a Paralympian athlete from France competing mainly in category T54 middle to long-distance events.

Eric competed in the 2004 Summer Paralympics in Athens in the 800m, 1500m and 5000m but it was when he was part of the French 4 × 400 m relay team that he won his only medal, a silver.

External links

 profile on paralympic.org

Paralympic athletes of France
Athletes (track and field) at the 2004 Summer Paralympics
Paralympic silver medalists for France
Living people
French male sprinters
French male middle-distance runners
French male long-distance runners
Medalists at the 2004 Summer Paralympics
Mediterranean Games gold medalists for France
Mediterranean Games medalists in athletics
Year of birth missing (living people)
Athletes (track and field) at the 2005 Mediterranean Games
Paralympic medalists in athletics (track and field)
20th-century French people
21st-century French people